John Wesley Bateman (15 December 1824 – 15 April 1909) was a Fremantle, Western Australia merchant who was later President of the Fremantle Chamber of Commerce

Life
The son of silk merchant John Bateman, John Wesley Bateman was born in London on 15 December 1824. In 1830 the Bateman family emigrated to Western Australia on board the Medina, settling in Fremantle, where John Bateman Snr established himself as general store owner, whaler and postmaster.
John Snr had three sons, Walter, John Wesley and Charles. Charles died in Indonesia on the way out to Australia. He also had six daughters.

John Bateman Snr died on 3 April 1855 soon after his wife took over his duties as postmaster. His sons took over the family business, which was formed into a company in 1857. Walter Bateman also succeeded his mother as postmaster from April 1855 to November 1861, served on the Town Trust in 1860, 1862, and 1864–65, and was chosen in Fremantle's first parliamentary election for nomination to the Legislative Council, where he sat from 1868 to 1870. He sold his share of the business to his brother John in 1872, and died unmarried on 24 September 1882. John Bateman took no active role in politics, but throughout his long life zealously pushed Fremantle's claims as a harbour, having an unrivalled knowledge of the nearby coast. He served on a committee for a new jetty in 1871, and was one of the few witnesses called by the 1892 select committee on the development of Fremantle Harbour. In 1890 he retired, selling his business to John Wesley Bateman (1852–1907), the eldest of his four surviving sons by his marriage on 17 August 1850 to Rachel White, formerly of Sydenham, London.

John Wesley Bateman was a member of the Fremantle Town Council between 1880 and 1882, and president of the Fremantle Chamber of Commerce from 1895 to 1900, at a time when the discovery of gold and the construction of an artificial harbour at Fremantle brought unparalleled expansion to business in the port. His descendants became prominent shareholders in the firm of J. & W. Bateman. As exporters of timber, sandalwood and horses, and importers of sugar and other tropical produce, the firm developed a considerable trade between Fremantle and south-east Asia during the century. Until the coming of steamships in 1888, the firm had a monopoly of the coastal trade to the north-west and the Kimberley, and continued to supply many sheep and cattle stations with stores and credit well into the twentieth century.

Bateman had the Union Stores Building on High Street, Fremantle constructed in 1895 for his expanding business to move into, the building is now heritage listed.

References

People from Fremantle
Australian merchants
1824 births
1909 deaths
Settlers of Western Australia
19th-century Australian businesspeople